Vali Sir Ab (also Romanized as Valī Sīr Āb, Valī Sīrāb, and Valīsīrāb) is a village in Garin Rural District, Zarrin Dasht District, Nahavand County, Hamadan Province, Iran. At the 2006 census, its population was 229, in 62 families.

References 

Populated places in Nahavand County